The Sitting Bull Trophy is the name of the rivalry trophy that was awarded to the winner of the annual football game between the University of North Dakota Fighting Hawks (formerly the North Dakota Fighting Sioux) and the University of South Dakota Coyotes. The rivalry stems from the time the two teams spent competing together in the North Central Conference (1922–2007) and later in the Great West Conference (2008–2011).

The Trophy
The oak bust, displaying a picture of Sitting Bull, designed in 1953 after a suggestion by newspaperman Al Neuharth. The inspiration for the trophy was a minor 1953 dispute over which state was home to the final resting place of the famed chief, after it revealed that Sitting Bull's family members had exhumed and reinterred what they believed to be his remains, moving them from Fort Yates, North Dakota to Mobridge, South Dakota. In 2000, the Sitting Bull Trophy retired, amid the ongoing NCAA controversy over the use of Native American names and symbols by its member institutions.

Future
As of 2017, the two teams are currently not competing in the same conference, with North Dakota joining the Big Sky Conference and South Dakota joining the Missouri Valley Football Conference following the demise of Great West Conference football in 2011. 2012 also marked the first year the two teams did not play each other since the 1940s, when World War II interrupted the rivalry; however, they both played each other in 2016 and 2017 in non-conference play. The two teams have met 96 times on the football field, with North Dakota currently holding a 62–31–5 edge in the all-time series. North Dakota joins the Missouri Valley Football Conference in 2020, renewing the annual rivalry.

Game results

See also  
 List of NCAA college football rivalry games

Notes

References

College football rivalries in the United States
College football rivalry trophies in the United States
North Dakota Fighting Hawks football
South Dakota Coyotes football